Eugène Henri Masson (17 January 1872 in Paris – 17 January 1963 in Meudon) was a French fencer who competed in the late 19th century and early 20th century.

He participated in Fencing at the 1900 Summer Olympics in Paris and won the silver medal in the foil. He was defeated by fellow French fencer Émile Coste in the final.

References

External links

1872 births
1963 deaths
Fencers from Paris
French male foil fencers
Olympic silver medalists for France
Olympic fencers of France
Fencers at the 1900 Summer Olympics
Place of birth missing
Olympic medalists in fencing
Medalists at the 1900 Summer Olympics